Lorenzo Malagrida (born 24 October 2003) is an Italian footballer who plays as an attacking midfielder for Serie A club Sampdoria.

Club career
Malagrida is a youth product of FBC Finale, Vado and Sampdoria. On 21 September 2022, he signed his first professional contract with Sampdoria until 2025. He made his professional debut with the club as a late substitute in a 1–0 Serie A loss to Fiorentina on 12 January 2023.

Personal life
Malagdrida is the nephew of former Italian footballer Antonio Manicone.

References

External links
 
 FIGC Profile

2003 births
Living people
Sportspeople from the Province of Savona
Italian footballers
Association football midfielders
Serie A players
U.C. Sampdoria players